
Gmina Gołymin-Ośrodek is a rural gmina (administrative district) in Ciechanów County, Masovian Voivodeship, in east-central Poland. Its seat is the village of Gołymin-Ośrodek, which lies approximately 19 kilometres (11 mi) south-east of Ciechanów and 64 km (40 mi) north of Warsaw.

Villages
Gmina Gołymin-Ośrodek contains the villages and settlements of Anielin, Chruściele, Garnowo Duże, Gogole Wielkie, Gogole-Steczki, Gołymin-Ośrodek, Gołymin-Północ, Gołymin-Południe, Gostkowo, Konarzewo Wielkie, Konarzewo-Gołąbki, Konarzewo-Marcisze, Konarzewo-Reczki, Konarzewo-Skuze, Konarzewo-Sławki, Mierniki, Morawka, Morawy-Kafasy, Morawy-Kopcie, Morawy-Laski, Morawy-Wicherki, Nasierowo Dolne, Nasierowo Górne, Nasierowo-Dziurawieniec, Nieradowo, Nowy Gołymin, Nowy Kałęczyn, Obiedzino Górne, Osiek Dolny, Osiek Górny, Osiek-Aleksandrowo, Osiek-Wólka, Pajewo Wielkie, Pajewo-Cyty, Pajewo-Rżyski, Pajewo-Szwelice, Ruszkowo, Rybakówka, Smosarz-Dobki, Smosarz-Pianki, Stare Garnowo, Truszki, Watkowo, Wielgołęka, Wola Gołymińska, Wróblewko, Wróblewo, Zawady Dworskie and Zawady Włościańskie.

Neighbouring gminas
Gmina Gołymin-Ośrodek is bordered by the gminas of Ciechanów, Gzy, Karniewo, Krasne, Opinogóra Górna and Sońsk.

References

Polish official population figures 2006

Golymin-Osrodek
Gmina Golymin Osrodek